Nuevo Tiempo (New Times) is a Spanish Christian TV channel and radio station for Central and South America, a version in Spanish language of the Brazilian channel Novo Tempo. Produced at the Adventist Media Center-Brazil from Nova Friburgo, Rio de Janeiro. There are repeaters stations in Argentina, Bolivia, Chile, Ecuador, Paraguay, Peru & Uruguay. It is owned by the Seventh-day Adventist Church. Nuevo Tiempo features programming produced by Adventist churches, colleges, hospitals and institutions, covering religious, health, educational and family life topics. Nuevo Tiempo is a 24-hour broadcaster on satellite and cable networks in South America and is available over-the-air in some communities.

Nuevo Tiempo is part of the Hope Channel network.

See also

 Media ministries of the Seventh-day Adventist Church

External links
 Official Website

References

Christian television networks
Seventh-day Adventist media